Albert Castiglia (born August 12, 1969) is an American blues singer, songwriter and guitarist. Castiglia has variously worked alongside Junior Wells, Sandra Hall, Aron Burton, Pinetop Perkins, Melvin Taylor, Sugar Blue, Phil Guy, Ronnie Earl, Billy Boy Arnold, Ronnie Baker Brooks, John Primer, Lurrie Bell, Jerry Portnoy, Larry McCray, Eddy Clearwater and Otis Clay.

AllMusic noted that "Castiglia combines hardcore blues with soul, rock, and country flavors for a sound that will appeal to rockers and blues purists alike." His vocal style has been compared to that of Van Morrison.

Life and career
Castiglia (pronounced "ka-steel-ya") was born in New York City, New York, United States, to a Cuban mother and Italian father. He moved with his family to Miami, Florida, when he was five years old and commenced learning the guitar seven years later.

Castiglia joined the Miami Blues Authority in 1990 and was named the 'best blues guitarist in Miami' by the Miami New Times in 1997.  Following a college education, Castiglia worked for four years for the state of Florida as a social services investigator. Discovered singing by Junior Wells in 1996, he joined his touring band and worked as Wells' lead guitarist until the latter's death in 1998.  By now living in Chicago, Illinois, Castiglia found work with Sandra Hall and toured with himself until the end of the century. In 2002, Castiglia joined David Shelley in the Alligator Alley Allstars, a "blues and roots super group" at Alligator Alley, a "Native Florida" restaurant and live music venue (named for the nearby swamp highway).

His first solo work, Burn, was self-released in 2004, followed in 2006 with The Bittersweet Sessions, where he collaborated with Graham Wood Drout. The New Jersey-based Blues Leaf Records then issued Castiglia's 2006 album, A Stone's Throw. It contained his versions of the Junior Wells song, "Hoodoo Man Blues" and The Shadows' "The Rise and Fall of Flingle Bunt".  In April 2008, These Are the Days was released, which included Castiglia's tribute to his former employer Junior Wells called "Godfather of the Blues", as well as cover versions of Bob Dylan's "Catfish", Nappy Brown's "Night Time Is the Right Time", Fenton Robinson's "Somebody Loan Me a Dime", and Little Willie John's track "Need Your Love So Bad". These Are the Days saw Castiglia get a nomination for a Blues Music Award for his self-penned song, "Bad Year Blues." He continued to tour and supported both ZZ Top and Elvin Bishop.

Keepin On (2010), recorded in Dover, New Jersey, featured five tracks written by Castiglia, plus covers of songs by John Lee Hooker ("Goin' Upstairs"), Mack Rice ("Cadillac Assembly Line"), T-Bone Walker ("My Baby is Now On My Mind"), Peter Green ("I Could Not Ask for More"), Robert Nighthawk ("Murderin' Blues") and Bob Dylan ("Till I Fell In Love With You"). Living the Dream (2012), included contributions on Hammond B3 organ and piano from John Ginty.  Roots Music Report bestowed him with the Top Blues Album Award for 2011 and 2012.  In December 2013, Castiglia performed at the Bradenton Blues Festival.

In March 2014, Castiglia signed a recording contract with Ruf Records. His seventh album in all and his first on Ruf Records was Solid Ground, which was recorded in Glen Ridge, New Jersey. It contained the Lefty Dizz-penned track "Bad Avenue", Castiglia's version of the blues standard, "Goin' Down Slow", and a cover of the Rolling Stones, "Sway". Solid Ground peaked at number 10 in the US Billboard Top Blues Albums chart.

In 2015, Castiglia made a guest appearance on John Ginty's albums, Bad News Travels and the subsequent Bad News Travels (Live).

In May 2020, Castiglia won a Blues Music Award in the 'Blues Rock Album of the Year' category for his album, Masterpiece.

Discography

Albums

See also
List of electric blues musicians

References

External links
Official website
These Are the Days review

1969 births
Living people
21st-century American male singers
21st-century American singers
American blues singer-songwriters
American blues guitarists
American male guitarists
Singer-songwriters from New York (state)
21st-century American guitarists
Guitarists from New York City
20th-century American guitarists
20th-century American male musicians
American male singer-songwriters
Ruf Records artists